Hanne Vataker  (born 28 May 1967) is a Norwegian sport shooter. She was born in Sandefjord. She competed at the 1992 Summer Olympics and the 1996 Summer Olympics.

References

External links 
 

1967 births
Living people
People from Sandefjord
Norwegian female sport shooters
Olympic shooters of Norway
ISSF rifle shooters
Shooters at the 1992 Summer Olympics
Shooters at the 1996 Summer Olympics
Sportspeople from Vestfold og Telemark
20th-century Norwegian women